Carlo Weis (born 4 December 1958) is a retired Luxembourgish footballer who played as a defender.

He was Luxembourg's most capped player of all-time from November 1995 until Jeff Strasser overtook his tally in 2008.

Club career
A central defender, Weis started his career at local side Spora Luxembourg before joining Belgian side F.C. Winterslag aged 20. With Winterslag, he reached the round of 16 in the 1981–82 UEFA Cup, having beaten Arsenal FC in the previous round. He played 3 seasons for the Genk outfit and then moved across the border to join Stade Reims. He rejoined Spora after only one season in France and played another 5 seasons for them. After one year at Thionville, he moved on to Avenir Beggen for whom he played 8 seasons, interrupted by 2 seasons at Sporting Mertzig where he also took up the manager's post. While with Avenir, he claimed the 1990 Luxembourgian Footballer of the Year award.

Weis retired as a player at the end of the 1999–2000 season, aged 41.

International career
Weis made his debut for Luxembourg in a March 1978 friendly match against Poland. In an international career spanning over 20 years, he went on to earn a record-breaking 87 caps, scoring one goal. He played in 30 World Cup qualification matches.

He played his final international game in May 1998, a friendly match against Cameroon.

International goals
Scores and results list Luxembourg's goal tally first.

Honours
 Luxembourg National Division: 1993, 1994

 Luxembourg Cup: 1992, 1993, 1994

 Luxembourgian Footballer of the Year: 1990

External links

References

1958 births
Living people
Luxembourgian footballers
Luxembourgian expatriate footballers
K.F.C. Winterslag players
Stade de Reims players
FC Avenir Beggen players
Expatriate footballers in Belgium
Expatriate footballers in France
Luxembourgian football managers
CA Spora Luxembourg managers
FC Avenir Beggen managers
F91 Dudelange managers
FC Swift Hesperange managers
Jeunesse Esch managers
Luxembourg international footballers
Luxembourgian expatriate sportspeople in Belgium
Luxembourgian expatriate sportspeople in France
Sportspeople from Luxembourg City
Belgian Pro League players
Association football defenders
Thionville FC players